Martin Schenkel (25 April 1968 – 26 March 2003) was a Swiss television actor and musician starring usually in Swiss German television productions.

Biography 
Martin Schenkel was born in Basel and after high school attended the University of the Arts Bern in Bern to study drama. He then moved to Germany for an engagement at the State Theater, Karlsruhe. His most popular role is the character of Flip in the Swiss comedy serial Fascht e Familie in the 1990s, where he had to break for reasons of health. Thenafter, Martin Schenkel was involved Lüthi und Blanc from 1999 to 2003 and contributed its theme "Whenever". He also became successful as a pop musician. Martin Schenkel died on 26 March 2003 in Zermatt after a brief illness.

Filmography (excerpt)

References

External links 
 
 Obituary by Charles Lewinsky 

1969 births
2003 deaths
Swiss male television actors
Swiss male film actors
20th-century Swiss male actors
Male actors from Zürich
Swiss comedians
Swiss pop musicians
20th-century Swiss musicians
20th-century comedians